This article lists the longest-serving members of the Parliament of Australia.

Longest total service
This section lists members of parliament who have served for a cumulative total of at least 30 years.

All these periods of service were spent in one House exclusively. A number of people have served in both the Senate and the House of Representatives, but none of them to date has had an aggregate length of service to the Parliament reaching 30 years.

No woman yet appears on this list. Bronwyn Bishop served in the Australian parliament longer than any other woman, in October 2014 outstripping the record of 27 years and 119 days previously held by Kathy Sullivan. At the end of her term at the 2 July 2016 double dissolution, Bishop had served for 28 years and 274 days.

†= Died in office

Chronological list
This section lists the members of parliament (and of each chamber) with the longest continuous service at any given time. The longest-serving MPs in each chamber are sometimes referred to as the "Father of the House" and "Father of the Senate", and very rarely the overall longest-serving MP is called the "Father of the Parliament".

House of Representatives Practice describes the title "Father of the House"  as a "completely informal designation" with "no functions attached to it".

Odgers' Australian Senate Practice notes that the title "Father of the Senate" is "now seldom referred to or used". It further notes that "as no woman senator has ever been in this situation, it is not clear what the title would be in that circumstance". Since then, the title has been assumed by Marise Payne, the longest serving female senator in Australia's history.

Longest-serving members by state and territory

See also
List of members of the United States Congress by longevity of service
List of historical longest-serving members of the United States Congress
Members of the Malaysian Parliament who have served for at least 30 years
Members of the New Zealand Parliament who have served for at least 30 years
Records of members of the Oireachtas (Ireland)
Records of members of parliament of the United Kingdom

References

Australia
Longest
Australia
Longest